The Lamplighter is a sentimental novel written by Maria Susanna Cummins and published in 1854, and a best-selling novel of its era.

Plot synopsis
A female Bildungsroman, The Lamplighter tells the story of Gertrude Flint, an abandoned and mistreated orphan rescued at the age of eight by Trueman Flint, a lamplighter, from her abusive guardian, Nan Grant. Gertrude is lovingly raised and taught virtues and religious faith.  She becomes a moralistic woman. In adulthood, she is rewarded for her long suffering with marriage to a childhood friend.

Response
The Lamplighter was Cummins's first novel and was an immediate best-seller, selling 20,000 copies in twenty days. The work sold 40,000 in eight weeks, and within five months it had sold 65,000. At the time it was second in sales only to Harriet Beecher Stowe's Uncle Tom's Cabin. It sold over 100,000 copies in Britain and was translated into multiple different languages.

Nathaniel Hawthorne wrote of the novel in an 1855 letter to William Ticknor: "What is the mystery of these innumerable editions of the Lamplighter, and other books neither better nor worse?" In this same letter Hawthorne made his infamous remark, "America is now wholly given over to a d—d mob of scribbling women." (He had censored the word "damned.") His letter today is posited as the primary "claim to fame" of the novel.

In 1950, James D. Hart (author of The Oxford Companion to American Literature) noted that The Lamplighter could provide insight into the American culture of its time:

The character of Gerty MacDowell in James Joyce's Ulysses is based on the heroine of the novel, Gerty Flint, in a portion of Ulysses generally believed to be a parody of Cummins' writing style. The connection of Gerty with The Lamplighter has been recognised as long back as Stanley Sultan's book The Argument of Ulysses published in 1964.

The Lamplighter was widely read for close to a century; for example, in 1915, the New York Public Library ordered 250 copies of a new edition.

Adaptations

The novel's success saw it quickly adapted for the stage. It was presented in numerous productions in the United States and England in the 1850s. It was also made into a silent film in 1921 with Shirley Mason playing the role of Gertie.

References

External links

Sentimental novels
1854 American novels
American bildungsromans
American novels adapted into films
American novels adapted into plays
Orphan characters in literature